Bhilakhedi is a census town in Narmadapuram district  in the state of Madhya Pradesh, India.

Demographics
 India census, Bhilakhedi had a population of 11,161. Males constitute 53% of the population and females 47%. Bhilakhedi has an average literacy rate of 82%, higher than the national average of 59.5%; with male literacy of 87% and female literacy of 76%. 10% of the population is under 6 years of age.

References

Cities and towns in Hoshangabad district
Hoshangabad